Veijo Kalevi Numminen (born 31 January 1940 in Tampere, Finland) is a retired professional ice hockey player who played in the SM-liiga.  He played for Tappara.  He was inducted into the Finnish Hockey Hall of Fame in 1986.

Numminen has also coached the national team of Finland in 1973-1974 and then again 1977-1982.

Kalevi's two sons, Teemu Numminen and Teppo Numminen are professional ice hockey players, with Teppo playing over 1,000 career games in the National Hockey League.

External links
 Finnish Hockey Hall of Fame bio

1940 births
Living people
Ice hockey people from Tampere
Finnish ice hockey players
Tappara players
Ice hockey players with retired numbers
Olympic ice hockey players of Finland
Ice hockey players at the 1960 Winter Olympics
Ice hockey players at the 1964 Winter Olympics
IIHF Hall of Fame inductees
Finland men's national ice hockey team coaches